Park Myeong-su (born 11 January 1998) is a South Korean football defender who plays for Daejeon Citizen in K League 2.

References

External links 
 

1998 births
Living people
Association football defenders
South Korean footballers
Gyeongnam FC players
Incheon United FC players
Daejeon Hana Citizen FC players
K League 1 players
K League 2 players
South Korea under-20 international footballers